Tim Ridinger is an American politician from Idaho. Ridinger is a former member of Idaho House of Representatives.

Early life 
On May 24, 1956, Ridinger was born in Sacramento, California.

Education 
Ridinger earned a bachelor's degree in business administration, real estate, from Boise State University.

Career 
In 1986, Ridinger became mayor of Shoshone, Idaho, until 2004.

On November 8, 1994, Ridinger won the election and became a Republican member of Idaho House of Representatives for District 21, seat B. Ridinger defeated Pattie Nafziger with 53.1% of the votes. On November 5, 1996, as an incumbent, Ridinger won the election and continued serving District 21, seat B. Ridinger defeated Darren Clemenhagen with 58.5% of the votes. On November 3, 1998, as an incumbent, Ridinger won the election unopposed and continued serving District 21, seat B. On November 7, 2000, as an incumbent, Ridinger won the election and continued serving District 21, seat B. Ridinger defeated Richard "Dick" Andreasen with 61% of the votes.

On November 5, 2002, Ridinger won the election and became a Republican member of Idaho House of Representatives for District 25, seat B. Ridinger defeated Donna Pence with 50.6% of the votes.
On November 2, 2004, Ridinger lost the election. Ridinger was defeated by Donna Pence 51% of the votes. Ridinger received 49% of the votes.

Personal life 
Ridinger's wife is Penny Ridinger. They have four children. Ridinger and his family live in Shoshone, Idaho.

References 

1956 births
Living people
Republican Party members of the Idaho House of Representatives
People from Sacramento, California
People from Shoshone, Idaho
21st-century American politicians